The Manhattan Project was the code name given to the American effort to develop the first nuclear weapons during World War II, with assistance from the United Kingdom and Canada.

Manhattan Project can also refer to:

Film and television
The Manhattan Project (film), a 1986 drama: a high school student builds his own nuclear bomb
"The Manhattan Project" (Ugly Betty), an episode of Ugly Betty

Music
The Manhattan Project (album), a 1990 album by a short lived jazz/fusion supergroup of the same name
The Manhattan Project (Carter Ace EP), a 2015 EP by hip hop artist Carter Ace
"Manhattan Project" (song), a 1985 song by Rush
 Manhattan Project (album), a 1978 album by Jamaican-born jazz trumpeter Dizzy Reece

Theater
The Manhattan Project, a theatrical company created in 1968 by Andre Gregory

Video games
Duke Nukem: Manhattan Project (2002), a video game
Teenage Mutant Ninja Turtles III: The Manhattan Project (1991), a video game
Manhattan Project, a canceled video game in development by Radical Entertainment during the late 1990s

See also
Manhattan (TV series), a 2014 WGN original series loosely based on the Manhattan Project
The Manhattan Projects, a comic book series about an alternate reality Manhattan Project developing a wider range of science experiments
Manhattan Project National Historical Park, a park commemorating the Manhattan Project located in Washington state, New Mexico and Tennessee
Manhattan Bail Project, a pre-trial services program from the 1960s
Mannahatta Project, ecological reconstruction of Manhattan as it appeared in 1609